Happy Ever After is a 1932 British-German musical film directed by Paul Martin and Robert Stevenson, and starring Lilian Harvey, Jack Hulbert, Cicely Courtneidge, Sonnie Hale, and Edward Chapman.

It was made as a co-production between the London-based Gainsborough Pictures and Germany's UFA. It was one of a series of co-productions between Gainsborough and German firms during the era, but it failed to meet the requirements 
to qualify as a British quota film.

A German-language version A Blonde Dream and a French-language version (Un rêve blond) were filmed at the same time. The film was shot in Berlin at the Babelsberg Studios using principally British actors. The film's sets were designed by the art director Erich Kettelhut.

Synopsis
A young woman who dreams of going to Hollywood and becoming a star, meets and falls in love with two window cleaners.

Cast
Lilian Harvey as Jou-Jou
 Jack Hulbert as Willie I
 Cicely Courtneidge as Illustrated Ida
 Sonnie Hale as Willie II
 Edward Chapman as Colonel
 Percy Parsons as Merriman
 Clifford Heatherley as Commissionnaire
 Charles Redgie as Secretary

References

External links
 

1932 films
1932 musical comedy films
German musical comedy films
British musical comedy films
Films of the Weimar Republic
1930s English-language films
1932 directorial debut films
British multilingual films
German black-and-white films
Films directed by Robert Stevenson
Films directed by Paul Martin
Films produced by Erich Pommer
Films shot in Berlin
German multilingual films
Films with screenplays by Billy Wilder
1932 multilingual films
1930s British films
1930s German films
Films shot at Babelsberg Studios